The Mlawula Nature Reserve is a nature reserve situated in north-eastern Eswatini. It covers approximately 16,500 hectares and is adjacent to Mbuluzi Game Reserve, Simunye Nature Reserve, and Hlane Royal National Park. 

The Mlawula area was first proclaimed as a protected area in 1914 but was subsequently deproclaimed and subdivided into cattle ranches. The first part of Mlawula to be proclaimed as a conservation area was donated in 1978, to become Ndzindza Nature Reserve. Mlawula Estates were purchased soon after followed by the donation of Nyala Ranch.

Mlawula has a high bird diversity and over 350 species have been recorded.

References

Protected areas of Eswatini
Protected areas established in 1978
1978 establishments in Swaziland